Ruten may refer to:

Places
Ruten, Germany, a village in Lower Saxony, Germany
Ruten (Hemne), a mountain in Hemne and Rindal municipalities in Trøndelag county, Norway
Ruten (Oppland), a mountain in Nord-Fron municipality in Oppland county, Norway
Ruten (Selbu), a mountain in Selbu municipality in Trøndelag county, Norway
Ruten (Troms), a mountain in Målselv municipality in Troms county, Norway

Other
Kōya Ruten, the sixth single of J-pop duo FictionJunction Yuuka